In the 2001–02 season Panathinaikos played for 43rd consecutive time in Greece's top division, Alpha Ethniki. The club also competed in the UEFA Champions League and the Greek Cup.

Players

Competitions

Alpha Ethniki

League standings

Results summary

Results by round

Matches

Greek Cup

Group 10

UEFA Champions League

Qualifying phase

Third qualifying round

First group stage

Group C

Second group stage

Group C

Knockout stage

Quarter-finals

References

External links
 Panathinaikos FC official website

Panathinaikos F.C. seasons
Panathinaikos